Adi or ADI may refer to:

Names and titles 
 Adi (mythology), an Asura in Hindu faith who appears in the Matsya Purāṇa
 Adi (name), a given name in Hebrew and a nickname in other languages
 Adi (title), a Fijian title used by females of chiefly rank

Places 
 Adi (Khanapur), Belgaum District, Karnataka, India
 Adi (Chikodi), Belgaum District, Karnataka, India
 Ahmedabad Junction railway station, Ahmedabad, India (code ADI)
 Adi, Israel, a community settlement in northern Israel
 Adi Island, an island in West Papua, Indonesia
 Arandis Airport, Arandis, Namibia (IATA: ADI)

Organizations
 Aerodynamics Inc., a small airline in the US
 Aircraft Designs Inc, an aircraft design firm in Monterey, California
 Alfred Deakin Institute, at Deakin University, in Geelong, Australia
 American Documentation Institute, former name of the Association for Information Science and Technology
 Analog Devices, Inc, producer of semiconductors (ADI is their symbol on the New York Stock Exchange)
 Animal Defenders International, a nonprofit campaigning group
 Associazione per il Disegno Industriale
 Australian Defence Industries, former name of Thales Australia
 Australian Doctors International
 Independent Democratic Action (Portuguese: Acção Democrática Independente), a political party in São Tomé and Príncipe

Abbreviations 
 Acceptable daily intake, in health and medicine
 Acting detective inspector, a type of police inspector
 Africa Development Indicators, a compilation of data assembled by the World Bank 
 Alternating direction implicit method for solving partial differential equations
 Ángeles del Infierno, a Spanish heavy metal band
 Anti-detonant injection, another name for water injection in internal combustion engines
 Approved Driving Instructor, a qualified UK car driver trainer
 Area of dominant influence, term used by Arbitron in media marketing 
 Authorised deposit-taking institution, a corporation authorised under the Australian Commonwealth Banking Act 1959
 Autism Diagnostic Interview, a parent interview used to aid diagnosis of autism

Other uses 
 Adinatha, 1st Jain Tirthankara
 ADI 4277 and ADPF 132 v. Brazilian civil union, actions to civil union equality
 Adi people, a tribe living in Arunachal Pradesh, India
 Adi language, the Tibeto-Burman language spoken by the Adi
 Adi tala, a tala (rhythm) in Carnatic music
 Banu Adi, a clan of the Quraish tribe of Mecca
 Mancala, a variant of the game

See also 

 
 
 
 Aadi (disambiguation)
 Addi (disambiguation)
 Adhi (disambiguation)
 Adis (disambiguation)
 ADY (disambiguation)

Language and nationality disambiguation pages